Rodney McCutcheon is an international lawn and indoor bowler born on 3 April 1962.

Rodney was born in Bangor, County Down and as a schoolboy first played on the short mats. In 1982 he defeated Tony Allcock in the British Isles Under-25 singles championship. His best moments came in the 1988 World Outdoor Bowls Championship when he struck Gold in the fours and in the 1990 Commonwealth Games when he helped Northern Ireland secure the silver.

References

Male lawn bowls players from Northern Ireland
Living people
People from Bangor, County Down
1962 births
Bowls players at the 1986 Commonwealth Games
Bowls players at the 1990 Commonwealth Games
Commonwealth Games medallists in lawn bowls
Commonwealth Games silver medallists for Northern Ireland
Bowls World Champions
Medallists at the 1990 Commonwealth Games